Jughead may refer to:

In fiction
 Jughead Jones, an Archie Comics character
 Jughead (comic book), a comic book series featuring the Archie Comics character
 Jug Head, Canadian nickname for the Kool-Aid Man

Music
 John Jughead, the pseudonym of Screeching Weasel guitarist John Pierson
 "Jughead", a song on Prince's 1991 album Diamonds and Pearls 

Other uses
 Jughead, the nickname for a version of the 1954 Mark 16 nuclear bomb
 Jughead (search engine), which worked under the Gopher protocol
 "Jughead" (Lost), an episode of the American television series Lost

See also
 Jughaid, a character in the newspaper comic Barney Google and Snuffy Smith